Ray Robertson is a Canadian novelist and contributing book reviewer at The Globe and Mail who lives in Toronto, Ontario. His work, "Why Not? Fifteen Reasons to Live," was short-listed for the Hilary Weston Prize for non-fiction and long-listed for the Charles Taylor Prize for non-fiction. "I Was There the Night He Died" was published in May 2014. In 2016, he published the non-fiction "Lives of the Poets (with Guitars)." In 2022, he published his newest novel, "Estates Large and Small".

His poetry collection The Old Man in the Mirror Isn't Me was shortlisted for the ReLit Award for poetry in 2021.

Bibliography

Novels
Home Movies. Cormorant Books, 1997.
Heroes. Dundurn, 2000.
Moody Food. Doubleday, 2002.  Santa Fe Writers Project, 2006. Biblioasis, 2009.  VLB, 2010.
Gently Down the Stream. Cormorant Books, 2005.
What Happened Later.  Thomas Allen Publishers, 2007.
David. Thomas Allen Publishers, 2009.
I Was There the Night He Died. Biblioasis, 2014.
1979. Biblioasis, 2018.
Estates Large and Small. Biblioasis, 2022.

Non-fiction 
Mental Hygiene: Essays on Writers and Writing. Insomniac Press, 2003.
Why Not? Fifteen Reasons to Live.  Biblioasis, 2011.
Lives of the Poets (with Guitars). Biblioasis, 2016.

References

External links
Author's website

Year of birth missing (living people)
Living people
Canadian male novelists
People from Chatham-Kent
Canadian male essayists
20th-century Canadian essayists
20th-century Canadian novelists
20th-century Canadian male writers
21st-century Canadian essayists
21st-century Canadian novelists
21st-century Canadian male writers